Byward Street is a road in the City of London, the historic and financial centre of London. It forms part of the A3211 route and, if travelling eastward, is a short continuation of Lower Thames Street from a junction with Great Tower Street, to Tower Hill. It is located within the City ward of Tower.

History

Constructed between 1895 and 1906 through the Met. and Dist. Railways (City Lines and Extensions) Act, 1882, Byward Street replaced the much older Black Swan Court, itself the successor to a Roman foundation. The tower itself was so named because it was by the Ward (Warders' Hall; meeting room and residences of the Yeoman Warders). Its close proximity to the Tower of London and All Hallows-by-the-Tower church ensure a steady stream of visitors, for whom the nearby Underground station at Tower Hill. A number of retail outlets and restaurants also line Byward Street.

It formed part of the marathon course of the 2012 Olympic and Paralympic Games. The women's Olympic marathon took place on 5 August and the men's on 12 August. The Paralympic marathons were held on 9 September.

See also
Other nearby streets:
Mark Lane
Mincing Lane
Pepys Street
Savage Gardens

References

Streets in the City of London